Lilya Efimovna Zilberstein (born 19 April 1965) is a Russian-born German pianist.

Biography
Born in Moscow and educated at the Gnessin State Musical College (1971–88), she rose to prominence after winning the 1987 Concorso Busoni. This success opened up the Italian halls to her, and as soon as she graduated she embarked on a tour, debuting in the Maggio Musicale Fiorentino. She finished with her German debut in Munich and she was immediately contracted by Deutsche Grammophon. She settled in Hamburg two years later, where she still lives with her husband and her two sons, Daniel and Anton. She has since had a successful concert career. She has been teaching at the Accademia Musicale Chigiana in Siena since 2011.

Selected discography
 Johannes Brahms - Variation on a theme by Paganini, op.35; Intermezzi op.117; 6 Pieces, op.118. 1990, Deutsche Grammophon.
 Brahms - 3rd Violin Sonata, op.108, along with Maxim Vengerov. EMI
 Brahms - Sonata for two pianos, op.34b, along with Martha Argerich. 2002, EMI.
 Brahms - 1st Piano Concerto, op.15; Tragic Overture [4 hands Brahms' arrangement], along with Cord Garben. Hänssler Classic
 Frédéric Chopin - 1st Piano Sonata, op.4; Mazurkas B. 4, 16, 73, 82, 85, 134, 140; Rondos op.1, 5., Waltzes in E flat major (op. posth KK 1237), and in A minor (op. posth, KK 1238-9), Deutsche Grammophon. 
 Edvard Grieg - Piano Concerto, op.16. Gothenburg Symphony Orchestra - Neeme Järvi. Deutsche Grammophon.
 Modest Mussorgsky - Pictures at an exhibition; Nikolai Medtner - 8 Forgotten Melodies, op.38 (selection); Sergei Taneyev - Prelude and Fugue, op.29
 Sergei Rachmaninoff - 2nd Piano Concerto, op.18; 3rd Piano Concerto, op.30. Berliner Philharmoniker - Claudio Abbado. Deutsche Grammophon. 
 Rachmaninoff - Cello Sonata, op.19, along with Gautier Capuçon. 2002, EMI.
 Rachmaninoff - Preludes, op.32 - Deutsche Grammophon
 Franz Schubert - Sonata D.850; Franz Liszt - Aprés une lecture du Dante; Schubert/Liszt - Gretchen am Spinnrade. 1990, Deutsche Grammophon. 
 Dmitri Shostakovich - 1st Piano Sonata op.12 - Deutsche Grammophon.
 Shostakovich - Concertino for two piano op.94 - along with Martha Argerich. 2006, EMI
 Ludwig van Beethoven - Sonata No. 2 in A Major, Op. 2. Live, 2007, K&K Verlagsanstalt.
 Beethoven - Sonata No. 23 in F Minor, Op. 57 "Appassionata". Live, 2007, K&K Verlagsanstalt.
 Brahms - Eight Pieces for Piano Opus 76. Live, 2008, K&K Verlagsanstalt.
 Brahms - Eleven variations on an original theme in D major Opus 21, No. 1. Live, 2008, K&K Verlagsanstalt.
 Brahms - Fourteen variations on a Hungarian melody in D major Opus 21, No. 2. Live, 2008, K&K Verlagsanstalt.
 Balakirev - Piano Concerto no. 2 in E flat, op. posthumous - live performance on YouTube.

References

External links
 Agency in USA   - Schmidt Artists International
 Agency in Europe  - Alexandra Heinz
  Biography
  "Lilya Zilberstein's recital at London's Wigmore Hall" by BILL NEWMAN
  Interview with Lilya Zilberstein, Thursday, September 24, 2009
  Concert Review "R.I. Philharmonic soars grandly for opener", September 28, 2009
 Lylia Zilberstein - Accademia Musicale Chigiana

1965 births
Jewish classical pianists
Living people
Prize-winners of the Ferruccio Busoni International Piano Competition
Russian classical pianists
Russian women pianists
Russian Jews
Women classical pianists
20th-century Russian musicians
20th-century Russian women musicians
20th-century classical pianists
21st-century classical pianists
21st-century Russian musicians
20th-century Russian women
20th-century women pianists
21st-century women pianists